The 210th Street–Williamsbridge station, signed as Williamsbridge–210th Street, was the penultimate station on the demolished IRT Third Avenue Line in the Bronx, New York City. It had three tracks and two side platforms. It was also in close proximity to Williamsbridge station of the New York and Harlem Railroad, which is today a station on the Metro-North Harlem Line. The next stop to the south was 204th Street. The next stop to the railroad north (compass east) was the lower level at Gun Hill Road under the IRT White Plains Road Line. The station opened on October 4, 1920, and closed on April 29, 1973.

References

External links
 
 
 

IRT Third Avenue Line stations
Railway stations in the United States opened in 1920
1920 establishments in New York City
Railway stations closed in 1973
Former elevated and subway stations in the Bronx
Norwood, Bronx